The 1993–94 South Midlands League season was 65th in the history of South Midlands League.

At the end of the previous season the league was reorganized from 2 divisions (Premier, One), to 3 divisions (Premier, Senior, One).

Premier Division

The Premier Division featured 15 clubs which competed in the division last season, along with 1 new club:
Bedford Town, promoted from the old Division One.

League table

Senior Division

The Senior Division featured 14 clubs, joined from the Premier Division and the old Division One.
5 Clubs joined from the Premier Division:
Leverstock Green
Totternhoe
Pitstone & Ivinghoe 
The 61 FC Luton
New Bradwell St. Peter  
9 Clubs joined from the old Division One:
London Colney
Bedford United
Risborough Rangers
Shenley & Loughton
Toddington Rovers
Winslow United
Tring Athletic
Shefford Town
Ampthill Town

League table

Division One

The Division One featured 16 clubs.
11 Clubs joined from the old Division One:
Potters Bar Crusaders
Caddington
Ashcroft 
Stony Stratford Town
Delco
Sandy Albion
Cranfield United
Emberton 
Flamstead
De Havilland
Walden Rangers 
5 Clubs joined the league:
Houghton Town
Scot
Eaton Bray
Mercedes Benz
Milton Keynes County

League table

References

1993–94
8